Boissezon is a commune in the Tarn department in southern France. Its inhabitants are known in French as Boissezonnais or as Boissesonols.

The village was originally known as Buxodunum, meaning "land of the buxus."

Demography

Personalities
Pierre Bernard, football player

See also
Communes of the Tarn department

References

Communes of Tarn (department)